Burleigh Taylor Wilkins (July 1, 1932 in Bridgetown, Virginia - October 13, 2015 in Tampa, Florida) was a professor in the Department of Philosophy of the University of California, Santa Barbara.

He studied at Duke University, (B.A. 1952); Harvard University (M.A., 1954); and Princeton University (M.A., 1963, Ph.D., 1965). He previously taught history at Shorter College in Rome, Georgia from 1956–57; humanities at the Massachusetts Institute of Technology, in Cambridge, Massachusetts from 1957–60; philosophy at Princeton University (1960–61, 1963) and at Rice University (1965-1967). He taught at the University of California, Santa Barbara, from 1968 until 2012.

He has written a biography on Carl L. Becker, and books on the philosophies of Edmund Burke, Hegel, and Karl Popper.

Publications
Carl Becker: a Biographical Study in American Intellectual History 
The Problem of Burke's Political Philosophy 
Hegel's Philosophy of History 
Has History Any Meaning?: A Critique of Popper's Philosophy of History 
Terrorism and Collective Responsibility

References

External links
UCSB faculty profile

University of California, Santa Barbara faculty
Duke University alumni
Harvard University alumni
Princeton University alumni
MIT School of Humanities, Arts, and Social Sciences faculty
Rice University faculty
Princeton University faculty
1932 births
2015 deaths
Shorter University faculty